Tawellemmet (Tawəlləmmət) is the largest of the Tuareg languages in the Berber branch of the Afroasiatic family. It is usually one of two languages classed within a language called Tamajaq, the other language being Aïr Tamajeq. Tawellemmet is the language of the Iwellemmeden Tuareg. It is spoken in Mali, Niger and parts of northern Nigeria by approximately 801,000 people.

Phonology

Vowels 

 Vowels may also be lengthened as /iː, eː, aː, oː, uː/.

 /i, a, u/ in lax form can be heard as [ɪ, æ, ʊ].

Consonants 

 Consonants may also occur as geminated.

See also
 Languages of Africa

References

Berber languages
Berbers in Mali
Berbers in Niger
Berbers in Nigeria
Tuareg languages